Federal elections were held in West Germany on 25 January 1987 to elect the members of the 11th Bundestag. This was the last federal election held in West Germany before German reunification.

Issues and campaign

The SPD nominated Johannes Rau, their vice chairman and the Minister-President of North Rhine-Westphalia, as their candidate for Chancellor. However, the SPD suffered from internal divisions and competition with the Greens. It was also unclear as to how they would form a government, as the Greens were divided over whether to take part in governments.

One of the major issues in this election was the environment, after the Chernobyl disaster and other accidents.

Results

Results by state

Constituency seats

List seats

Post-election
The coalition between the CDU/CSU and the FDP returned to government, with Helmut Kohl as Chancellor. The Greens came into parliament for the second time and seemed to be established on federal level.

Notes

References

Sources
 The Federal Returning Officer
 Psephos

Federal elections in Germany
1987 elections in Germany
Helmut Kohl
January 1987 events in Europe
1987 in West Germany